NGC 1288 is an intermediate barred spiral galaxy located about 196 million light years away in the constellation Fornax. In the nineteenth century, English astronomer John Herschel described it as "very faint, large, round, very gradually little brighter middle." The morphological classification of SABc(rs) indicates weak bar structure across the nucleus (SAB), an incomplete inner ring orbiting outside the bar (rs), and the multiple spiral arms are moderately wound (c). The spiral arms branch at intervals of 120° at a radius of 30″ from the nucleus. The galaxy is most likely surrounded by a dark matter halo, giving it a mass-to-light ratio of /.

On July 17, 2006, a supernova with a magnitude of 16.1 was imaged in this galaxy from Pretoria, South Africa, at 12″ east and 2″ of the galactic core. Designated SN 2006dr, it was determined to be a type Ia supernova.

References

External links
 

Fornax (constellation)
Barred spiral galaxies
1288
012204